Jiří Cetkovský (born November 4, 1983 ) is a Czech professional ice hockey player. Cetkovsky currently plays for HC Kladno.

Playing career
Cetkovsky was selected by the Calgary Flames in the fifth round (141st overall) of the 2002 NHL Entry Draft. For the 2002–03 season, Cetkovsky moved to Calgary, and played with the Calgary Hitmen junior team. In 2003, Cetkovsky returned to the Czech Republic and played for HK Jestřábi Prostějov of the Czech2 league. In 2004, Cetkovsky transferred to HC Pardubice of the Czech Extraliga. Cetkovsky played with Pardubice until 2011. Cetkovsky moved to Mladá Boleslav in 2011.

Career statistics

References

External links

1983 births
Calgary Hitmen players
Czech ice hockey forwards
HC Dynamo Pardubice players
Living people
Calgary Flames draft picks
Rytíři Kladno players
LHK Jestřábi Prostějov players
Czech expatriate ice hockey players in Canada
Czech expatriate ice hockey players in Slovakia